Salted Music is an American electronic dance music record label, based in San Francisco, California, founded by Miguel Migs.

Artists 
 Miguel Migs
 Lisa Shaw
 Julius Papp
 Deeplomatik (DJ Seb Skalski)
 Soledrifter
 Yogi & Husky

Releases 
 SLT100: The Deposit Box - Miguel Migs - Release Date: July 19, 2016
 SLT099: La Papaye – Lumoon & Rob!n - Release Date: June 17, 2016
 SLT098: I Wanna Dance – Deeplomatik - Release Date: May 13, 2016
 SLT097: I Can See It – Lisa Shaw - Release Date: April 22, 2016
 SLT096: The Flavor Saver EP Vol. 17 - Release Date: April 1, 2016
 SLT095: Call It Anything – Soledrifter - Release Date: March 11, 2016
 SLT094: Eyes For You – Miguel Migs feat. Martin Luther - Release Date: February 26, 2016
 SLT093: Everything in Between – Kinky Movement - Release Date: Feb 12, 2016
 SLT092: Soul Searching EP – Relative - Release Date: December 18, 2015
 SLT091: My Love My Sins EP – Sebb Junior - Release Date: November 20, 2015
 SLT090: Space Drop EP – Deeplomatik - Release Date: November 6, 2015
 SLT089: The Flavor Saver EP Vol 16 - Release Date: October 16, 2015
 SLT088: So Good – Miguel Migs - Release Date: August 7, 2015 
 SLT087: Dimensions EP – Fabio Tosti - Release Date: July 17, 2015
 SLT086: The Beat Inside – Soledrifter - Release Date: May 19, 2015
 SLT085: The Flavor Saver EP Vol 15 - Release Date: April 21, 2015
 SLT084: The Melody – Miguel Migs - Release Date: April 7, 2015
 SLT083: The Way EP – Sebb Junior - Release Date: March 17, 2015
 SLT082: The Weapon is the Word – Kinky Movement - Release Date: February 24, 2015
 SLT081: Falling – Lisa Shaw - Release Date: February 10, 2015
 SLT080: The Flavor Saver EP Vol 14 - Release Date: December 16, 2014
 SLT079: Crossed Signals EP - Release Date: November 25, 2014
 SLT078: Feelings – Russ Jay feat. Natalie Wood - Release Date: November 4, 2014
 SLT077: Below the Surface EP – Demarkus Lewis Release Date October 7, 2014
 SLT076: Flavor Saver EP Vol 13 - Release date September 9, 2014
 SLT075: I Can Feel It – Miguel Migs - Release Date – August 12, 2014
 SLT074: The Next Drop EP – Deeplomatik - Release Date: May 27, 2014
 SLT065: Corrado Rizza presents Global Mind - In The Heat (Miguel Migs Remixes) - Release Date: July 2, 2013 
 Miguel Migs - Dance and Clap
 Manuel Sahagun - Wake Me Up EP
 Miguel Migs - Tonight
 Miguel Migs - The Flavor Saver EP, Volume 9
 Miguel Migs - The System
 Lisa Shaw - Honey
 Miguel Migs - The Flavor Saver EP, Volume 8
 Miguel Migs - Close Your Eyes
 Jay West - Still Groovin' EP
 Miguel Migs - Outside the Skyline
 Christian Alvarez feat. Mr. V. - All Nations
 Miguel Migs - The Flavor Saver EP, Volume 7
 Miguel Migs feat. Evelyn "Champagne" King - Everybody
 Miguel Migs - Red & Dread
 Yogi & Husky - Bass, Drums, Harmony EP
 Jay West - The Restart EP
 Miguel Migs - The Flavor Saver EP, Volume 6
 Husky - The Soul Of Sydney EP
 Arco - Special Things EP
 Lisa Shaw - FREE EP
 Miguel Migs - The Flavor Saver EP, Volume 5
 Sonny Fodera - Into My Mind
 TNT Inc. vs. Alex Dimitri - Jingo
 Phonic Funk - The Northern Lights EP, Volume 2
 Justin Michael & Dave Mayer feat. Maiya - Lost In The Music
 Christian Alvarez feat. Jo'Leon Davenue - The Way
 Miguel Migs - The Flavor Saver EP, Volume 4
 Andrew Chibale - Mango Biche EP
 Lisa Shaw - Can You See Him
 Nathan G - Melbourne EP
 Frakensen and Tom Wax - Bodyworker EP
 Phonic Funk - The Northern Lights EP, Volume 1
 Fabio Tosti - Set Me Free EP
 Dutchican Soul - Get On Down
 Miguel Migs - Dubs and Rerubs
 Miguel Migs - Get Salted Volume 2
 Miguel Migs - The Flavor Saver EP Volume 3
 Lisa Shaw - Like I Want To
 Miguel Migs - The Flavor Saver EP Volume 2
 Yogi & Husky - Body Language EP
 Lisa Shaw - Free
 Miguel Migs - More Things EP
 Lisa Shaw - Music In You
 Joshua Heath - Writers Block EP
 Miguel Migs feat. Sadat X - Shake It Up
 Miguel Migs - The Flavor Saver EP Volume 2
 Sonny J Mason - Life Is The Music
 Miguel Migs - Those Things Remixed
 Lisa Shaw - All Night High
 Yogi & Husky - The Random Soul EP
 Miguel Migs - Let Me Be
 Joshua Heath - The Turning Tables EP
 Miguel Migs feat. Lisa Shaw - Those Things
 Miguel Migs - Those Things
 Miguel Migs - So Far
 Joshua Heath - The Coldcuts EP
 Miguel Migs - The Favor Saver EP Volume 1
 Chuck Love - Spread The Love
 Miguel Migs - Get Salted volume 1
 Li'Sha Project - Feel
 Chuck Love - Frozen in Minneapolis
 Roomsa feat. Lady Sarah - Sunris
 Kaskade - Safe
 Miguel Migs feat. Li'Sha - Do It For You
 Soledrifter - No Holding Back EP
 Sebb Aston- Feel Alright EP

Footnotes

References 
 [ Billboard Magazine]
 [ Allmusic Review]
 Exclaim! Music Review
 eMusic Review

External links
 Official Website

American record labels
Record labels established in 2004
Electronic dance music record labels
House music record labels
Electronic music record labels